Modern Girls is a 1986 American comedy film directed by Jerry Kramer, starring Virginia Madsen, Daphne Zuniga and Cynthia Gibb.

Plot summary 
Three women in their early 20s, Margo, Kelly, and Cece, are roommates living in Los Angeles working menial jobs by day, and by night they enjoy the vibrant and decadent nightlife of the city.

Margo has a boring job in telemarketing, Cece gets fired from her job at a department store, while Kelly works in a pet store and is very good at selling pets, mainly thanks to her looks.

It is Friday night and the women are getting ready for a night out on the town. However, Margo and Cece soon discover that Kelly has taken Margo's car to go meet a DJ she's infatuated with.

Luckily, Kelly's date for the night, Clifford, one of her many infatuated customers, arrives to pick her up, so Margo and Cece hitch a ride with him to go to the club where the DJ is working. Cliffie (as Cece calls him) reluctantly tags along a rollercoaster ride with them and learns how the women usually spend their nights out.

Meeting rock star Bruno X, surviving a police raid, getting dumped by DJ Brad, taking a trip on ecstasy, escaping from crazed fans and a run-in with a sexual criminal are some of the situations the group gets themselves into.

Cast
 Cynthia Gibb as Cece
 Virginia Madsen as Kelly
 Daphne Zuniga as Margo
 Clayton Rohner as Clifford/Bruno X
 Chris Nash as Ray
 Martin Ferrero as music video director
 Stephen Shellen as Brad
 Rick Overton as Marsats
 Troy Evans as club owner
 John Dye as Mark
 Mark Holton as Boss 
 Stuart Charno as Nerdy Guy
 Cameron Thor as D.J. #1
 Ron Campbell as D.J. #2
 Josh Richman as Milo
 Pamela Springsteen as Tanya
 Mike Muscat as mechanic

Original soundtrack
 Modern Girls (soundtrack)
 Depeche Mode - "But Not Tonight". Written by Martin Gore. The song was released as a promo single in February 1986 and later in 12" format in the United States only, accompanied by a music video featuring footage from Modern Girls to help promote the movie. The video was included on the second DVD included in the 2002 UK version of The Videos 86–98.

Reception 
On Rotten Tomatoes the film holds a 40% rating based on 5 reviews.

Home media 
On April 2, 2012, Modern Girls was brought to DVD, as part of the MGM Limited Edition Collection series.

See also
 List of American films of 1986

References

External links
 
 

1986 films
1986 comedy films
1986 directorial debut films
1980s buddy comedy films
1980s English-language films
1980s female buddy films
American buddy comedy films
American female buddy films
American independent films
Atlantic Entertainment Group films
Films produced by Gary Goetzman
Films set in Los Angeles
Films shot in Los Angeles
1980s teen comedy films
American teen comedy films
1980s American films